Badrabad (also Romanized as Badrābād and Badarābād; also known as Mehrābād-e Pā’īn) is a village in Shohada Rural District, in the Central District of Meybod County, Yazd Province, Iran. At the 2006 census, its population was 43, in 12 families.

References 

Populated places in Meybod County